The Gulf 27 is an American sailboat that was designed by Capital Yachts as a cruiser and first built in 1970.

The design was mostly likely the basis for the extended Gulf 29, introduced in 1982.

Production
The design was built by Capital Yachts in Harbor City, California, United States, starting in 1970, but it is now out of production.

Design
The Gulf 27 is a recreational keelboat, built predominantly of fiberglass, with wood trim. It has a masthead sloop rig, a raked stem, a plumb transom, an internally mounted spade-type rudder controlled by two wheels, one in the cockpit and one in the pilot house and a fixed fin keel. It displaces  and carries  of ballast.

The design has sleeping accommodation for three people, with a double "V"-berth in the bow cabin and a straight settee in the main cabin, next to a drop-leaf table. The galley is located on both sides of the companionway ladder, with a two-burner stove to starboard and a sink and ice box to port. The navigation station is on the starboard side of the pilot house. The head is located just aft of the bow cabin on the port side.

See also
List of sailing boat types
Related development
Gulf 29

References

External links
Photo of a Gulf 27

Keelboats
1970s sailboat type designs
Sailing yachts
Sailboat type designs by Capital Yachts
Sailboat types built by Capital Yachts